Ronen A. Cohen is an Israeli scholar of Middle Eastern studies. He is an associate professor at Ariel University, and heads both its Middle Eastern & Central Asian Studies (MECAS) center and Department of Middle Eastern and Political Science Studies.

Cohen's main field of research is contemporary history and politics of Iran and he has written numerous works on the subject including monographs on Iranian organizations the Hojjatieh, the Forqan and the Mojahedin-e Khalq.

Views 
Cohen maintains that Ruhollah Khomeini was immensely influenced by Musa al-Sadr, deriving "most of his methods and vision" from his pupil. He credits Iranian Revolution to Sadr, not Khomeini, stating "Khomeini conducted the music, but the music was composed by al-Sadr."

In a June 2013 interview with The Jerusalem Post, Cohen categorically dismissed that the next Iranian president, to-be-elected in 2013 presidential election, may follow a nuclear policy different from his predecessor and said "the president is a clerk, a pawn of the supreme leader".

Writing an opinion piece for Israel Hayom in 2018, Cohen remarked that regime change is inevitable in Iran: "it is just a matter of time before the revolution implodes and blows up in everyone's face".

Published works 
Books as author
 
 
 
 
 
Book chapters
 
Books as editor
 
Selected papers

References 

1976 births
Living people
Israeli historians
Historians of Iran
Bar-Ilan University alumni
Academic staff of Ariel University